McGrath is a surname of Irish origin.

McGrath may also refer to:

Places
United States:
McGrath, Alaska, a village
McGrath, Minnesota, a town
McGrath State Beach, Oxnard, California

Antarctica:
Mount McGrath
McGrath Nunatak

Other uses
McGrath Foundation, an Australian breast cancer support and education charity
McGrath Cup, a Gaelic Football competition in Munster, Ireland
McGrath's Fish House, restaurant chain in the American Pacific Northwest

See also
 Clan McGrath
Magrath (disambiguation)
McGraw (disambiguation)